The Star Parade are an Irish–Italian rock band based in Milan, Italy. The band formed in late 2008, when they quickly released five tracks online for public review. The band, known locally as TSP, was created by Des Anderson and Fab Martini. TSP speedily accessed many avenues within the industry since this time. Having quickly made its mark within the online community, they are now being tied to fashion labels and the arts within Milan. Anderson, being Irish, has brought an international side to the band while Martini has brought years of training in sound design and engineering within Italy. They have created a unique sound within the Italian music industry. Albeit different from what Italy expects, TSP have strangely slotted into the music world there and found their place. It has been rumored by TgCom  that the band are working with Thomas Black (You're a Star Ireland and A&R man for Sony/EMI Records) with regards to publishing their music worldwide, but for now they are working within Italy and most recently started work with Solomasagio, based in Milan.

References

External links

 
Solomasagio
Tgcom article
Schermo article
Magazine Pragma article

Italian rock music groups
Musical groups established in 2008
Italian musical duos
Musical groups from Milan